The following is a list of Sphingidae of Nepal. One-hundred and twenty-nine different species are listed.

This list is primarily based on Colin Smith's 2010 "Lepidoptera of Nepal", which is based on Toshiro Haruta's "Moths of Nepal (Vol. 1-6)" with some recent additions and a modernized classification.

Subfamily Sphinginae
Agrius convolvuli - convolvulus hawkmoth
Megacorma obliqua - black-belted hawkmoth   
Acherontia lachesis - greater death's head hawkmoth
Acherontia styx - lesser death's head hawkmoth
Meganoton analis - grey double-bristled hawkmoth 
Meganoton rufescens rufescens - rosy double-bristled hawkmoth 
Psilogramma increta - plain grey hawkmoth 
Psilogramma menephron - large brown hawkmoth 
Apocalypsis velox - bald hawkmoth 
Pentateucha curiosa - hirsute hawkmoth 
Pseudodolbina fo fo - acanthus hawkmoth 
Thamnoecha uniformis - chir-pine hawkmoth 
Dolbina inexacta - common grizzled hawkmoth

Subfamily Smerinthinae
Amplypterus mansoni - manson's mango hawkmoth  
Amplypterus panopus - mango hawkmoth  
Ambulyx liturata liturata - violet gliding hawkmoth 
Ambulyx maculifera - spotted gliding hawkmoth  
Ambulyx ochracea - ochreous gliding hawkmoth  
Ambulyx placida - plain gliding hawkmoth 
Ambulyx sericeipennis agana - common gliding hawkmoth 

Ambulyx moorei - cinnamon gliding hawkmoth
Ambulyx substrigilis substrigilis - dark-based gliding hawkmoth 
Clanis bilineata - two-lined velvet hawkmoth 
Clanis deucalion - three-lined velvet hawkmoth 
Clanis phalaris - common velvet hawkmoth 
Clanis titan - scarce velvet hawkmoth 
Clanis undulosa gigantia - wavy velvet hawkmoth 
Leucophlebia lineata - large candy-striped hawkmoth 
Polyptychus dentatus - straight-lined crenulate hawkmoth 
Polyptychus trilineatus undatus - common crenulate hawkmoth 
Marumba cristata - common swirled hawkmoth 
Marumba dyras - dull swirled hawkmoth 
Marumba gaschkewitschii irata
Marumba indicus - lesser swirled hawkmoth 
Marumba spectabilis - rosy swirled hawkmoth 
Marumba sperchius albicans - large swirled hawkmoth 
Marumba sperchius gigas - large swirled hawkmoth 
Morwennius decoratus - ornamented hawkmoth  
Langia zenzeroides zenzeroides - apple hawkmoth 
Rhodoprasina floralis - large olive hawkmoth 
Clanidopsis exusta - white streaked hawkmoth 
Craspedortha porphyria - purple hawkmoth 
Cypa decolor - common cypa 

Cypa uniformis - pale cypa 
Smerinthulus perversa - lichenous hawkmoth 
Degmaptera mirabilis - variegated hawkmoth  
Callambulyx poecilus - lesser pink-and-green hawkmoth 
Callambulyx rubricosa - large pink-and-green hawkmoth 
Anambulyx elwesi - elwes’ pink-and-green hawkmoth 
Phyllospingia dissimilis perundulans - brown-leaf hawkmoth 
Sataspes infernalis- dull carpenter-bee hawkmoth

Subamily Macroglossinae
Cephonodes hylas - common bumble-bee hawkmoth / coffee bee hawkmoth  
Daphnis hypothous - jade hawkmoth
Daphnis nerii - oleander hawkmoth
Dahira rubiginosa - rosy dahira 
Ampelophaga dolichoides - green banded hawkmoth 
Ampelophaga khasiana khasiana - scarce vine hawkmoth 
Ampelophaga rubiginosa harterti - common vine hawkmoth 
Dahira obliquifascia - black-striped dahira 
Dahira yunnanfuana- white-spot dahira 
Dahira tridens - three-banded dahira 
Elibia dolichus- large banded hawkmoth 
Acosmeryx anceus subdentata - rosy forest hawkmoth 
Acosmeryx naga naga - common forest hawkmoth 
Acosmeryx omissa - obscure forest hawkmoth 
Acosmeryx pseudonaga - false common forest hawkmoth 
Acosmeryx sericeus - silky forest hawkmoth 
Acosmeryx shervillii - dull forest hawkmoth 
Eupanacra busiris - green rippled hawkmoth 
Eupanacra metallica - metallic rippled hawkmoth 
Eupanacra mydon - common rippled hawkmoth / alocasia hawkmoth 
Eupanacra perfecta - model rippled hawkmoth 
Eupanacra sinuata - sinuous rippled hawkmoth 
Eupanacra variolosa - brown rippled hawkmoth 
Angonyx testacea - northern dark-green hawkmoth 
Enpinanga assamensis - lesser dimorphic hawkmoth / assam hawkmoth 
Nephele didyma f. didyma
Nephele hespera - crepuscular hawkmoth 
Neogurelca himachala - crisp-banded hawkmoth 
Neogurelca hyas - even-banded hawkmoth  
Gurelca masuriensis - diffuse-banded hawkmoth 
Sphingonaepiopsis pumilio - tiny hawkmoth 
Eurypteryx bhaga bhaga - hook-winged hawkmoth 
Hayesiana triopus - nonsuch hawkmoth 

Macroglossum belis - common hummingbird hawkmoth 
Macroglossum bombylans - humble bee hawkmoth 
Macroglossum corythus luteata - walker's hummingbird hawkmoth  
Macroglossum fritzei
Macroglossum insipida - hermit hummingbird hawkmoth
Macroglossum gyrans - striated hummingbird hawkmoth 
Macroglossum pyrrhosticta - burnt-spot hummingbird hawkmoth   
Macroglossum saga - grey-tipped hummingbird hawkmoth 
Macroglossum variegatum - variegated hummingbird hawkmoth
Rhopalopsyche nycteris - himalayan hummingbird hawkmoth 
Hyles galii nepalensis - bedstraw hawkmoth
Hyles livornica - striped hawkmoth 
Deilephila elpenor macromera - large elephant hawkmoth
Deilephila rivularis - obscure elephant hawkmoth
Hippotion boerhaviae - pale striated hawkmoth 
Hippotion celerio - common striated hawkmoth / silver-striped hawkmoth
Hippotion rafflesi  - raffles’ striated hawkmoth 
Hippotion rosetta - swinhoe's striated hawkmoth 
Hippotion velox - dark striated hawkmoth 
Theretra alecto - levant hunter hawkmoth  

Theretra boisduvalii
Theretra clotho - common hunter hawkmoth  
Theretra griseomarginata - grey-edged hunter hawkmoth  
Theretra latreillii lucasii - latreille's hunter hawkmoth  
Theretra lycetus - grey-banded hunter hawkmoth   
Theretra nessus - orange-sided hunter hawkmoth / yam hawkmoth
Theretra oldenlandiae - white-banded hunter hawkmoth  
Theretra pallicosta - white-edged hunter hawkmoth  
Theretra silhetensis - brown-banded hunter hawkmoth  
Theretra suffusa - suffused hunter hawkmoth   
Pergesa acteus - green pergesa hawkmoth  
Rhagastis albomarginatus - pale-edged mottled hawkmoth 
Rhagastis castor aurifera - common mottled hawkmoth 
Rhagastis confusa confusa - indistinct mottled hawkmoth   
Rhagastis gloriosa - crimson mottled hawkmoth  
Rhagastis hayesi
Rhagastis lunata - lunulate mottled hawkmoth 
Rhagastis olivacea - olive mottled hawkmoth 
Rhagastis velata - veiled mottled hawkmoth 
Cechenena aegrota - mottled green hawkmoth 
Cechenena helops - spotted green hawkmoth 
Cechenena lineosa - striped green hawkmoth 
Cechenena minor - lesser green hawkmoth 
Cechenena mirabilis - emerald green hawkmoth  
Cechenena scotti - scott's green hawkmoth 
Cechenena subangustata

See also
List of butterflies of Nepal
Odonata of Nepal
Cerambycidae of Nepal
Zygaenidae of Nepal
Wildlife of Nepal

References

 01
Sphingidae
Insects of Nepal